Coughran is a surname. Notable people with the surname include:

John Coughran (born 1951), American basketball player
Tom B. Coughran (1906–1993), American banker, soldier, and public servant

See also
Coughlan
Coughran Peak, a mountain of Ross Island, Antarctica